Jocara gillalis is a species of snout moth. It is found in South America.

References

Moths described in 1925
Jocara